Koçi is an Albanian surname. Notable people with the surname include:

 Koçi Bey (died 1650), Albanian Ottoman bureaucrat
 Elez Koçi (1856-1916), Albanian activist
 Ervin Koçi, Albanian politician
 Koçi Xoxe (1911-1949), Albanian politician
 Akil Mark Koci (born 1946), Kosovo Albanian composer
 Hafiz Sabri Koçi (1921-2004), Albanian cleric
 Amanda Ava Koçi, known as Ava Max, American singer of Albanian origin

See also
 Kočí, Czech surname

Albanian-language surnames